The 1989 Liberty Bowl was a college football postseason bowl game played on December 28, 1989, in Memphis, Tennessee. The 31st edition of the Liberty Bowl was contested between the Ole Miss Rebels and the Air Force Falcons.

Background
The Rebels finished tied for 4th in the Southeastern Conference while the Falcons finished 2nd in the Western Athletic Conference. This was the first year in which the winner of the Commander in Chief's Trophy received an automatic bid to the Liberty Bowl. The two teams had matched up before in 1983. Chucky Mullins (who had been paralyzed in a game just two months prior) visited the Ole Miss locker room prior to the game in his first visit outside the hospital prior to his injury.

Game summary

First quarter
 Ole Miss – Hines 32 pass from Darnell (Hogue PAT), 3:53 remaining
 Air Force – Wood 37 FG, 11:16 remaining
 Ole Miss – Baldwin 23 run (Hogue PAT), 9:18 remaining
 Air Force – Dowis 2 run (pass failed), 3:19 remaining

Second quarter
 Ole Miss – Baldwin 21 run (Hogue PAT), 10:20 remaining
 Ole Miss – Coleman 58 punt return (Hogue kick), 1:21 remaining

Third quarter
 Air Force – Johnson 3 run (run failed), 12:50 remaining
 Ole Miss – Coleman 11 run (Hogue PAT), 0:26 remaining

Fourth quarter
 Ole Miss – Thigpen 8 pass from Shows (Hogue PAT), 10:44 remaining
 Air Force – Senn 35 pass from McDowell (pass failed), 9:02 remaining
 Air Force – Senn 21 pass from McDowell (Durham run), 2:34 remaining

Randy Baldwin rushed for 177 yards on 14 carries with two touchdowns, and John Darnell passed for 19-of-33 for 261 yards and a touchdown.

Aftermath
The two teams would meet up three years later in the Liberty Bowl again.

Statistics

References

Liberty Bowl
Liberty Bowl
Ole Miss Rebels football bowl games
Air Force Falcons football bowl games
1989 in sports in Tennessee
December 1989 sports events in the United States